The Kawasaki W175 is a  air-cooled four-stroke single-cylinder motorcycle made by Kawasaki since 2017. It is a retro styled, like the Kawasaki W series along with the Estrella (now called as W250), W650, and W800.

Kawasaki held the world premiere launch for this bike at Jakarta in November 2017, thus began selling this bike for the Indonesian domestic market. As for now, the bike has been exported for Thailand, Philippines, and Latin American market such as Uruguay, Mexico and Bolivia.

The engine is fuelled by a Mikuni VM24 carburetor, aimed for easier maintenance. Like the W800, the bike does not have a kick start, instead it is equipped with electric start. No center stand (although a side stand does come as standard), no tachometer, and no fuel indicator.

This bike gained some popularity among bike modification enthusiasts and public figures, including President Jokowi of Indonesia who owns a chopper-style modified version of this bike and Governor Ridwan Kamil of West Java.

It is sold in a few different versions, including the W175 Standard, W175 Cafe, and W175 TR dual purpose. All versions except the dual-purpose have a teardrop styled  fuel tank. The dual purpose TR models have a 7.5 L fuel tank. For the lighting equipment, the bike uses halogen bulbs for the H4 60/55 headlight with clear multi reflectors. As for the turning signal lights and side mirrors, the bike use the same parts from Kawasaki KLX150.

Performance wise, the bike was tested by an automotive journalist team and got a top speed figure of 110.1 km/h. Based on the test, the bike could accelerate to 100 km/h speed in 16.3 seconds.

References 

W175